Back to Mine: Nick Warren is a DJ mix album, the first in the Back to Mine series, compiled and mixed by Nick Warren.

The mix focuses on downtempo tracks, with Allmusic calling it "a smart and non-confrontational mix safe from predawn noise complaints". CMJ New Music Report called it a "felicitous cocktail of psilocybin and mescaline".

Iain Stewart, in The Rough Guide to Ibiza and Formentera, viewed Warren's mix as one of the best in the series.

Track listing

References

Warren, Nick
Nick Warren albums
2001 compilation albums